This chronological list of famous watchmakers is a list of those who influenced the development of horology or gained iconic status by their creations. The list is sorted by the lifetimes of the watchmakers.

You can find following information:

 Full name
 Dates of birth and death, if known 
 Country of origin and profession
 Field of activity (italics)

Until 1400 
 Amemhet (1555–1505 BC), Egyptian count and engineer, clepsydra.
 Ktesibios (3rd century BC), Greek engineer, clepsydra with hands and dial.
 Andronikos of Kyrrhos (1st century BC), Greek engineer, clepsydra and sun dial.
 Zhang Heng (78–139), Chinese mathematician and inventor, clepsydra with extra reservoir. 
 Yin Gui (6th century AD), Chinese engineer, clepsydra with constant water level.
 Geng Xun (7th century AD), Chinese engineer, balancing clepsydra. 
 Yuwen Kai (7th century AD), Chinese engineer, balancing clepsydra. 
 Yi Xing (683–727), Chinese Buddhist and engineer, astronomical clock.
 Zhang Sixun (10th century AD), Chinese engineer, clepsydra with water wheel. 
 Su Song (11th century AD), Chinese engineer, clepsydra with water wheel and ratchet. 
 Al-Dschazarī, Arabic engineer and author of the 12th century, elephant clock.
 Richard of Wallingford (1292–1336), English mathematician, astronomer and abbot, Wallingford, Oxfordshire, astronomical clock of Abbey St Albans.
 Jacopo de Dondi (1293–1359), Italian astronomer and clockmaker, Padua, astronomical clock of Palazzo del Capitanio.
 Giovanni de Dondi (1318–1389), Italian savant and professor, Milan, astrarium.
 Nicolaus Lillienveld (1350/1365–1418/1435), German clockmaker and engineer, Rostock, astronomical clock of the St. Nicholas' Church in Stralsund.
 Mikuláš z Kadaně (1350–1420), Czech clockmaker and mechanic, Prague, Prague astronomical clock.

1400–1500 
 Friar Paulus Almanus (c. 1475), German Augustine clockmaker, Augsburg, first drawing of the verge escapement.
 Jakob Zech (?–1540), Bohemian clockmaker, Prague, table clocks.
 Julien Coudrey (or Couldray) (?–1530), French watchmaker, Paris, royal watchmaker of Louis XI of France and Francis I of France, rapier handle watch.
 Peter Henlein (c. 1479–1542), German locksmith, Nürnberg, portable clocks and watches.
 Nicolaus Kratzer (1487–late 1550), German mathematician and astronomer, Munich, royal astronomer of Henry VIII of England, sun dial.
 Laurentius Liechti (c. 1489–1545), Swiss clockmaker, Winterthur, founder of the clockmaker dynasty Liechti.
 Hans Luterer (c. 1489–1548), German and Swiss clockmaker, Freiburg im Breisgau, turret clocks.
 Kaspar Brunner (?–1561), Swiss mechanic, Bern, Zytglogge.

1500–1600 

 Jan Táborský z Klokotské Hory (1500–1572), Czech astronomer and mechanic, Prague, Prague astronomical clock.
 Juanelo Turriano (c. 1500–1585), Spanish clockmaker of the court, Toledo, astronomical clock, restoring the astrarium of Giovanni Dondi.
 Ulrich Schniepp (?–1588), German clockmaker, Munich, sun dials, clockmaker of the court.
 Taqi al-Din (1526–1585), Ottoman clockmaker, Istanbul, astronomical clocks, and instruments, alarm clock, pocket watch.
 Bartholomew Newsam (?–1593); English watchmaker, London, royal watchmaker of Elizabeth I of England.
 Ebert Baldewein (1525–1593), German Hofbaumeister and astronomer, Kassel, Wilhelmsuhr, Planetenlaufuhr.
 Erhard Liechti (c. 1530–1591), Swiss clockmaker, Winterthur.
 Jeremias Metzker (1530–c. 1592), German clockmaker, Augsburg, astronomical table clocks.
 Hans Gruber (1530–1597), German clockmaker, Nürnberg, table clocks, grandfather clocks.
 Christoph Schißler (1530–1608), German clockmaker, Augsburg, sun dial, astrolabe.
 Nicolas Urseau (1531–1568), French clockmaker, London, clockmaker of the court from Edward VI of England to Elizabeth I of England.
 Nicolas Urseau (?–1590), English clockmaker, London, clockmaker of the court of Elizabeth I of England.
 Erasmus Habermehl (c. 1538–1606), clockmaker, Prague, astronomical and geodetic instruments.
 Isaac Habrecht (1544–1620), Swiss clockmaker, Schaffhausen, astronomical clock of the Straßburger Münster.
 Georg Roll (1546–1592), German clockmaker, Augsburg, Globusuhren.
 Christoph Trechsler (1546–1624), German instrument maker, Dresden, sun dial.
 Hans Schlothaim (1546–1625), German clockmaker, Augsburg, automatic clocks.
 Moritz Behaim (c. 1550), Austrian clockmaker, Vienna, clockmaker of the court.
 Johann Reinhold (1550–1596), German clockmaker, Augsburg, astrolabe, table clocks.
 Jost Bürgi (1552–1632), German clockmaker and instrument builder, Kassel, astronomer.
 Josias Habrecht (1552–1575), Swiss clockmaker, Schaffhausen, astronomical clock  of the Straßburger Münster.
 Hans Leo Haßler (1564–1612), German composer and clockmaker, Nürnberg. music boxes.
 Andreas Utzmüller (c. 1580), German clockmaker, Bamberg, wooden clock with automated figurines.
 Leonhardt Miller (before 1580–c. 1652), German clockmaker, Nürnberg. sun dial.
 Randolph Bull (1582–1617), English clockmaker, London, clockmaker of the court.
 Daniel Scheyrer (1582–1662), Austrian clockmaker, Vienna.
 Elias Allen (1588–1653), (C. C.), English clockmaker, London, sun dials.
 Anthoine Arlaud (c. 1590–?), French clockmaker, Geneva, cross clocks and astronomical pocket watches.
 Jean Vallier (?–1649), French clockmaker, Lyon, shape watches, pendant watches.
 David Ramsey (c. 1590–1654), English clockmaker, London, clockmaker of the court, pocket watch.
 Christoph Margraf (c. 1595), German clockmaker, Augsburg, clockmaker of the court in Wien, rolling ball clock.
 Jacques Sermand (1595–1651), Swiss watchmaker, Geneva, shape clocks, crucifix clocks.
 Johannes Sayler (1597–1668), German watchmaker, Ulm, rolling ball clock, turret clocks, table clocks.
 Nicolas Lemaindre (1598–1652), French clockmaker, Blois, clockmaker of the court.
 Jost Bodeker von Wartbergh, German vicar, Osnabrück. craft clock with a centrifugal pendulum (1578 to 1587).

1600–1700 

 Heinrich Gebhardt (1602–1661), German clockmaker, Straßburg, astronomical clock.
 Wolfgang Hager (1602–1674), German clockmaker, Arnstadt.
 Jean Rousseau (1606–1684), Swiss watchmaker, Geneva, complicated pocket watch.
 Ahasuerus Fromanteel (1607–1693), Dutch clockmaker, London and Amsterdam, pendulum clocks.
 Egbert Jans van Leeuwarden (1608–1674), Dutch clockmaker, Utrecht.
 Edward East (bl. 1610–1693), (C. C.), English clockmaker, London, cofounder of the Worshipful Company of Clockmakers, clockmaker of the court.
 David Ramsay (bl. 1613–1651), (first Master of the C. C.), Scottish clockmaker, London, clockmaker of the court of Jakob I and Karl I.
 Salomon Coster (1622–1659), Dutch clockmaker, The Hague, first pendulum clock like Christiaan Huygens.
 Albrecht Erb (1628–1714), Austrian clockmaker, Vienna, clockmaker of the court, astronomical clock.
 Isaac Thuret (?–1706), French clockmaker, Paris, clockmaker of the court.
 Nathaniel Barrow (?–1699), (C. C.), English clockmaker, London, Master of the Worshipful Company of Clockmakers.
 David Bouquet (1632–?), French watchmaker, pocket watches.
 Edward Barlow (1636–1716), English watchmaker, ratchet chime with repeater.
 William Clement (1638–1704), English watchmaker, London, Clement escapement.
 Thomas Tompion (1639–1713), (C. C.), English clockmaker, London, Master of the Worshipful Company of Clockmakers.
 Joseph Knibb (1640–1711), English clockmaker, London, clocks.
 Johann Martin (1642–1721), German watchmaker, Augsburg, pocket watches, sun dials and table clocks.
 Jean de Hautefeuille (1647–1724), French physician and inventor, Orléans, balance wheel.
 Simon Lachez (1648–1723), Dutch watchmaker, Utrecht, guilt master.
 Daniel Quare (1648–1724), (C. C.), English watchmaker, London, Master of the Worshipful Company of Clockmakers, rack strike movement with repetition.
 Joseph Norris (1650–after 1700), English clockmaker, London, longcase clock, table clocks.
 Johann Willebrand (1658–1726), German clockmaker, Augsburg, clock, sun dial.
 Franz Ludwig Stadlin (1658–1740), Swiss Jesuit, royal clockmaker of the court of China.
 George Etherington (?1660–1728), (C. C.), English clockmaker, York, London, Master of the Worshipful Company of Clockmakers.
 Matthias Ernst (1663–1714), German clockmaker, Ulm. Clockmaker of the city Ulm, longcase clock.
 Nicolas Fatio de Duillier (1664–1753), Swiss mathematician, Duillier, drilled rubies.
 Bernardo Facini (1665–1731), Italian astronomer, mathematician and instrument manufacturer in Venice, Farnasian Clock
 Jacques Thuret (1669–1738), French watchmaker, Paris, clockmaker of the court Louis XIV of France.
 Christopher Pinchbeck (1670–1732), English watchmaker, London.
 Simon Dilger (1671–1750), German clockmaker, Schollach, Waag clock, teacher.
 George Graham (1673–1751), English watchmaker, London.
 Franz Ketterer (1676–1749), German clockmaker, Schönwald im Schwarzwald, cuckoo clock.
 Benjamin Gray (1676–1764), English clockmaker. London, clockmaker of the court of George II.
 Franz Xaver Bovius (1677–1725), German priest and maker of sun dial, Eichstätt.
 Jean Dutertre (1684–1734), French watchmaker, Paris, duplex escapement.
 Johannes Klein (1684–1762), Czech mathematician, astronomer and mechanic, Prague, astronomical clock  and instruments at the Clementinum.
 Julien Le Roy (1686–1759), French clockmaker of the court Louis XV of France, Paris, pocket watch, introduction of oil sinks.
 Martin Schipani (1693–1759), German watchmaker, Würzburg.
 Jehan-Jacques Blancpain (1693–?), Swiss watchmaker, Villeret. Founder of watch company Blancpain.
 John Harrison (1693–1776), English carpenter and autodidact watchmaker, London, chronometer
 Johann Jacob Möllinger (1695–1763), German watchmaker, Neustadt an der Weinstraße, the Palatinate privileged watchmaker.
 Johann Delucca (1697–1753), Austrian clockmaker, Vienna, longcase clocks, carriage clocks.
 Henry Bridges (1697–1754), English architect and clockmaker, Waltham Abbey, Monumentaluhr Microcosm
 Étienne LeNoir (1699–1778), watchmaker in Paris, master since 1717

1700–1800

1700–1750 

 John Jefferys (1701–1754), (C. C.), English watchmaker, London, pocket watches
 Johan Zeller (1701–1778), Swiss clockmaker, Basel, night clocks.
 Anders Polhammar (1705–1767), Swedish watchmaker, Stjärnsund.
 John Ellicott d. J. (1706–1772), English watchmaker and inventor, London, clockmaker of the court, compensating pendulum.
 Jacques de Vaucanson (1709–1782), French watchmaker, Paris, automaton clocks.
 Pierre-Joseph de Rivaz (1711–1772), Swiss clockmaker, Paris, one year clock.
 Justin Vulliamy (1712–1797), English clockmaker, London, precision pendulum clock.
 Leopold Hoys (1713–1797), German clockmaker, Bamberg,
 John Whitehurst (1713–1788), English clockmaker, Derby.
 Jean Romilly (1714–1796), Swiss watchmaker, Paris, pocket watch.
 Jean François Poncet (1714–1804), Swiss watchmaker of French origin, clockmaker of the court in Dresden and director of the Grünes Gewölbe.
 Jean-Baptiste Dutertre (1715–1742), French watchmaker, duplex escapement.
 Joseph Möllinger (1715–1772), German clockmaker, Frankenthal, mechanic, piano builder and mint master, clockmaker of the Palatine Zweibrücken court in Zweibrücken.
 Thomas Mudge (1715–1794), English watchmaker, London. inventor of the free lever escapement.
 Pierre Le Roy (1717–1785), French watchmaker, Paris, marine chronometer.
 Joseph Gallmeyr (1717–1790), German clockmaker, Munich, clockmaker of the court and mechanic of the court.
 Johann Albert Roetig (1718–1787), German watchmaker, Hachenburg.
 Larcum Kendall (1719–1790), British watchmaker, London, marine chronometer.
 Jean André Lepaute (1720–1789), French royal watchmaker, Paris.
 Jean Antoine Lépine (1720–1814), French watchmaker, Paris, Lépine caliber, pocket watch.
 Friedrich Möllinger (1720 or 1726–1767), German watchmaker, Mannheim, clockmaker of the court.
 Pierre Jaquet-Droz (1721–1790), Swiss clockmaker, La Chaux-de-Fonds.
 James Cox (1723?–1800), English clockmaker, London, machines, export clocks.
 Daniel Beat Ludwig Funk (1726–1787), Swiss clockmaker, Bern, pendulums.
 David Ruetschmann (Frater David a Sancto Cajetano) (1726–1796), clockmaker and mechanic, Vienna, astronomical clock.
 Jean Baptiste Lepaute, (1727–1802), French royal clockmaker, Paris.
 Willem Snellen (1727–1791), Dutch clockmaker, Dordrecht, astronomical clock, marine chronometer.
 Ferdinand Berthoud (1727–1807), Swiss watchmaker and author, Paris, marine chronometer.
 Pater Aurelianus a San Daniele (1728–1782), German Augustine friar, Thüringen, astronomical longcase clock.
 Sebastian Baumann (1729–1805), German watchmaker, Friedberg, carriage clock.
 Louis Berthoud (1729–1807) Swiss chronometer maker, Paris.
 Abraham-Louis Perrelet (1729–1826), Swiss watchmaker, Le Locle, pocket watch.
 Jean-Marc Vacheron (1731–1805), Swiss watchmaker, Geneva, founder of Vacheron Constantin. 
 Josiah Emery (1732–1794), Swiss-born London-based watchmaker, the first to incorporate the lever escapement invented by Thomas Mudge 
 Pierre-Augustin Caron de Beaumarchais (1732–1799), French entrepreneur and writer, Paris, double comma escapement.
 Alexander Cumming (1733–1814), (C. C.), English watchmaker, mathematician and mechanic, London.
 Iwan Petrowitsch Kulibin (1735–1818), Russian clockmaker and inventor, Nizhny Novgorod, automated clock for Catherine the Great.
 Franz Jacob Braun (1735–1813), German clockmaker, Eberbach, locksmith and clockmaker.
 John Arnold (1736–1799), (C. C.), English watchmaker, London, marine chronometer.
 Jacob Kock (1737–1805), Swedish clockmaker of the court of Gustav III of Sweden, Stockholm, cartel clock.
 Philipp Gottfried Schaudt (1739–1809), German schoolmaster and mechanic, Onstmettingen, astronomical clock.
 Philipp Matthäus Hahn (1739–1790), German pastor, engineer, and inventor.
 Johannes Möllinger (1739–1815), German clockmaker, Fischbach, Kaiserslautern, clockmaker of the court.
 Mette Magrete Tvistman (1741–1827), Danish clockmaker 
 Robert Robin (1742–1799), French watchmaker, Paris, clockmaker of the court, pocket watch, pendulums.
 Hilaire Bassereau (?–1806), French watchmaker, Paris. clockmaker of the court.
 John Grant (?–1810), English watchmaker, London, chronometer.
 Jean-Moïse Pouzait (1743–1793), Swiss watchmaker and inventor, Geneva, lever escapement.
 Jacques-Frédéric Houriet (1743–1830), Swiss watchmaker, Le Locle, pocket watch, tourbillon. 
 Jules Jürgensen (1745–1811), Danish watchmaker and manufacturer, Le Locle, pocket watch, longcase clock.
 Peter Kinzing (1745–1816), German clockmaker and mechanic.
 Daniel Möllinger (1746–1794), German clockmaker, Heidelberg, city clock maker.
 Thomas Reid (clockmaker) (1746–1831), English watchmaker, Edinburgh, deck watch.
 Jean-Frédéric Leschot (1747–1824), Swiss clockmaker, Geneva, androids
 Benjamin Vulliamy (1747–1811), English clockmaker of the court George III of the United Kingdom, London, precision pendulum clock, pocket watch, pocket chronometer.
 Abraham Louis Breguet (1747–1823), Swiss watchmaker and mechanic, tourbillon, Breguet overcoil.
 John Brockbank  (1747–1806), English chronometer maker, London, pocket and marine chronometer.
 George Margetts (1748–1808), English chronometer maker, London, pocket and marine chronometer.
 James McCabe (1748–1811), English watchmaker, London, pocket watch.
 Thaddäus Rinderle (1748–1824), German clockmaker and mathematician, Freiburg, watchmaking tools.
 Hubert Sarton (1748–1828), Belgian clockmaker, Liège, pendulums, automatic pocket watch.
 Frédéric Japy (1749–1813), French watchmaker and manufacturer, Beaucourt, ébauche.
 Johann Gottfried Sechting (1749–1814), German clockmaker, student of Hahn, astronomical clock.
 Thomas Earnshaw (1749–1829), English clock and chronometer maker, London, marine chronometer.
 Antoine Tavan (1749–1836), Swiss watchmaker, Geneva, Präzisionstaschenuhren.

1750–1800 

 Johann Anton Roetig (1750–1800), German clockmaker, Hachenburg.
 Paul Philipp Barraud (1750–1820), (C. C.), English clockmaker, London, chronometer.
 Georg Matthias Burger (1750–1825), German mystic, Nürnberg. sun dial, mechanical terrestrial and celestial globes.
 Antide Janvier (1751–1835), French clockmaker, Paris,  astronomical clock.
 Johann Peter Stahlschmidt (1751–1833), German clockmaker, Freudenberg, grandfather clocks.
 Alexius Johann (1753–1826), German engineer of astronomical clocks.
 Simon Willard, (1753–1848), American clockmaker, Boston, Banjo-Clock.
 Pierre Louis Berthoud (1754–1813), French watchmaker, Paris, chronometer, pocket watches.
 Elias Möllinger (1754–1799), German watchmaker, Neustadt. 
 Christian Möllinger (1754–1826), German clockmaker and author, Berlin, chief clockmaker of the court, pendulum clocks.
 Noël Bourret (1755–1803), French clockmaker. 
 Theobald Schmitt (1756–1835), German clockmaker and gunsmith, Lindenfels-Odenwald.
 Louis Courvoisier (1758–1832), Swiss watchmaker, La Chaux-de-Fonds, pocket watch and pendulums.
 Johann Christoph Schuster (1759–1823), German clockmaker. inventor of a calculator.
 Levi Hutchins (1761–1855), American clockmaker, Concord (New Hampshire), inventor of the alarm clock.
 Philipp Fertbaur (1763–1820), Austrian clockmaker, Vienna, Laterndluhr.
 Philipp Happacher (?–1843), Austrian clockmaker, Vienna, precision pendulum clock.
 William Anthony (ca. 1764–1844), English watchmaker, London, pocket watches for the Chinese market.
 Baptist Johann (1765–1826), German engineer, astronomical clocks.
 Jacob Auch (1765–1842), south German clockmaker, Weimar, student of Philipp Matthäus Hahn, clockmaker of the court.
 Justus Jacob Hespe (1765–1842), German clockmaker, mechanic and inventor, Hannover, three-wheeled driving machine.
 Louis Moinet (1768–1853), French watchmaker, sculptor, and painter, Paris, chronograph, clocks.
 John Roger Arnold (1769–1843), (C. C.), English clockmaker, London, marine and pocket chronometer.
 Joseph Geist (c. 1770–1824), Austrian clockmaker, Graz, first Austrian clock producer.
 Frédéric-Louis Favre-Bulle (1770–1849), Swiss chronometer maker, Le Locle, marine chronometer, tourbillon.
 Willam Congreve (1772–1828), English jurist and technician, London, rolling ball clock.
 Jean Francois Bautte (1772–1837), Swiss watchmaker, Geneva, very thin pocket watches.
 Eli Terry (1772–1852), American manufacturer and clockmaker, Connecticut, introduction of mass production to clock making.
 David Henri Grandjean (1774–1845), Swiss watchmaker, Le Locle, highly complicated pocket watch.
 John Bliss (1775–1857) American chronometer maker, New York, marine chronometer.
 Jean-Baptiste Schwilgué (1776–1856), French clockmaker, Straßburg, restorer of the clockwork of the astronomical clock at the Straßburger Münster.
 Urban Jürgensen (1776–1830), Danish watchmaker, Copenhagen, deck watch, tourbillon.
 Philipp Schmitt (1777–1827), German clockmaker Lindenfels.
 William Frodsham (1779–1850), English clock and chronometer maker, London, chronometer.
 John Barwise (1780 or 1790–1842), English clock and chronometer maker.
 Josef Kossek (1780–1858), Czech clockmaker, Prague, precision pendulum clock.
 Benjamin Louis Vulliamy (1780–1854), (C. C.), English clockmaker, turret clock, clocks, clockmaker of the court.
 Johann Kessels (1781–1849), German-Danish chronometer maker, Altona, marine chronometer and deck watch.
 Louis Benjamin Audemars (1782–1833), Swiss watchmaker and manufacturer, Le Brassus.
 Josef Božek (1782–1835), Czech inventor and clockmaker, Prague, precision pendulum clock.
 Friedrich Wilhelm Roetig (1782–1861), German clockmaker, Hachenburg.
 Johann Christian Friedrich Gutkaes sen. (1785–1845), Dresden, watchmaker, royal clockmaker of the court.
 Seth Thomas (1785–1859), American manufacturer and clockmaker, Connecticut, Seth Thomas Clocks.
 Jean-Francois Motel (1786–1857), French chronometer maker, Paris, marine chronometer.
 Ephraim Downes (1787–1860), American clockmaker, Connecticut, wooden clock.
 Peter Friedrich Ingold (also: Piere Ingold) (1787–1878), Swiss watchmaker and manufacturer, La Chaux-de-Fonds/Boston, pocket watch, tools (Ingold-Fräse).
 François Constantin (1788–1854), Swiss entrepreneur, Geneva, Vacheron Constantin.
 Thomas Frederick Cooper(1789-1863) English watchmaker London, pocket watch
 Edward John Dent (1790–1853), English watchmaker, London, pocket watch, marine chronometer.
 Jean Jacob (1793–1871), French clockmaker, Paris, chronometer, longcase clock.
 Chauncey Jerome (1793–1868), American clockmaker, Connecticut, New Haven Clock Co.
 Christian Friedrich Tiede (1794–1877), German clockmaker, Berlin, marine chronometer.
 Carl Suchy, (1796–1866), Bohemian watch producer, Prague, pendulum clocks, k.u.k. Hoflieferant.
 Edouard Bovet (1797–1849), Swiss watchmaker and entrepreneur, watch brand Bovet.
 James Ferguson Cole (1798–1880), English watchmaker, London, pocket watch, deck watch.
 Johann Mannhardt (1798–1878), German maker of turret clocks, Munich, Mannhardt-Escapement, turret clock Münchner Frauenkirche.
 Joseph Saxton (1799–1873), American clockmaker, inventor and instrument maker, Philadelphia.
 Joseph Thaddäus Winnerl (1799–1886), Austrian watchmaker, Paris, marine chronometer.
 Franz Baumann (before 1800–after 1852), Austrian clock and chronometer maker, Vienna. clockmaker of the court, tourbillon.

1800–1900

1800–1850 

 William Frederick Rippon (?–1827), (C. C.), English clockmaker, London, the Great Clock of Westminster.
 Louis-Gabriel Brocot (1800–1860), French big clock maker, Paris, Brocot-Hemmung.
 James Eiffe (1800–1880), English chronometer maker, compensation for secondary temperature error.
 Georges Auguste Leschot (1800–1884), Swiss watchmaker and inventor, Geneva, Vacheron Constantin.
 Jean-Célanis Lutz (1800–1863), Swiss watchmaker, hardening of steel spirals.
 Edward Prior (1800–1868), English watchmaker, London, pocket watch for the Turkish market.
 Jean Paul Garnier (1801–1869), French clockmaker, Paris, electric clocks.
 Carl August von Steinheil (1801–1870), German physician and astronomer, Munich, first electric clock.
 Jules Sueur (1801–1867), Swiss watchmaker, astronomer and inventor, Geneva, astronimichal time theory implementation.
 Charles Klaftenberger (1802–1874), English chronometer maker, London.
 George Airy (1802–1892), English astronomer and director of the Royal Greenwich Observatory.
 Andreas Hohwü (1803–1885), Dutch chronometer maker, Amsterdam, astronomical clock.
 Charles Antoine LeCoultre (1803–1881), Swiss watchmaker, Le Sentier, Jaeger-LeCoultre.
 Charles-Félicien Tissot (1804–1873), Swiss Watchmaker, Le Locle, founder of Tissot.
 Louis Clément François Breguet (1804–1883), French watchmaker, Paris, central clock of Lyon, tuning fork clock.
 Achille Hubert Benoit (1804–1895), French watchmaker, Versailles, director of the royal factory, director of the watchmaking school of Cluses.
 Heinrich Moser (1805–1874), Swiss watchmaker from Schaffhausen (Switzerland), founder of H. Moser & Cie.
 Lorenz Bob (1805–1878), German clockmaker, Furtwangen, Schwarzwald.
 Carl Theodor Wagner (1805–1885), German master watchmaker and entrepreneur, Wiesbaden.
 Auguste-Lucien Vérité (1806–1887), French clockmaker, Beauvais, astronomical clock.
 Friedrich Adolph Nobert (1806–1881), German mechanic and optician, Barth.
 Johann Carl Rahsskopff (1806–1886), German clockmaker and mechanic, Koblenz, clocks with worm gears.
 Lorenz Furtwängler (1807–?), German clockmaker and manufacturer, Furtwangen, wall clocks.
 Michael Welte (1807–1880), German musical clock maker, Freiburg im Breisgau, M. Welte & Sons Co., Schwarzwald.
 Jules Frederik Jürgensen (1808–1877), Danish watch- and chronometer maker, Le Locle, deck watch.
 Auguste Agassiz (1809–1877), Swiss Watchmaker, Fribourg, founder of Longines.
 Charles Frodsham (1810–1871), English watch and chronometer maker, London, chronometer, tourbillon.
 Frédéric-William Dubois (1811–1869), Swiss chronometer maker, Le Locle, astronomical pendulum clock.
 Alexander Bain (1811–1877), Scottish watchmaker and inventor. Glasgow.
 Johann Harder (1811–1888), German farmer and tinker, inventor of the lannual clock about 1875.
 Johann Weule (1811–1897), German clockmaker, Harz, Turmuhren.
 Antoni Norbert Patek (1811–1877), Polish pioneer in watchmaking, creator of Patek Philippe & Co
 Eduard Eppner (1812–1887), German clockmaker, Halle/Lähn, pocket watch, Turmuhren.
 Aaron Lufkin Dennison (1812–1895), American watchmaker, Maine, USA. Waltham Watch Company. pocket watch.
 Georg Friedrich Roskopf (1813–1889), German watchmaker, La Chaux-de-Fonds, Roskopf escapement.
 Matthäus Hipp (1813–1893), German clockmaker, Bern, electric precision pendulum clock.
 Edward Howard (1813–1904), American watchmaker and manufacturer, Waltham Watch Company, pocket watch.
 Friedrich Emil Roetig (1814–1863), German watchmaker, Hachenburg, Taleruhr.
 Romuald Božek (1814–1899), Czech inventor and watchmaker, Prague.
 Ferdinand Adolph Lange (1815–1875), German watchmaker and entrepreneur, Glashütte.
 Adrien Philippe (1815–1894), French watchmaker, Paris, Patek Philippe.
 Johann Baptist Beha (1815–1898), German clockmaker, Eisenbach, Black Forest cuckoo clock.
 Edward Daniel Johnson (1816–1889), (C. C.), English watchmaker, London, chronometer, fellow of the Royal Society.
 Claudius Saunier (1816–1896), French watchmaker and teacher, Paris.
 Edmand Denison (1816–1905), English lawyer and architect, Nottinghamshire, engineer of the turret clock of Big Ben.
 Auguste Grether (1817–1897), Swiss watchmaker, Le Locle, tourbillon.
 Friedrich Krille (1817–1863), German chronometer maker, Altona, marine chronometer, precision pendulum clock.
 Achille Brocot (1817–1878), French clockmaker, Paris, improvement of the Brocot escapement.
 Auguste Grether (1817–1879), Swiss watchmaker, Ponts-de-Martel, chronometer ebauches, tourbillon.
 Louis-Victor Baume (1817–1887), Swiss watch producer, Bern, Baume & Mercier.
 Edward Thomas Loseby (1817–1890), English watchmaker, London, marine chronometer
 Antoine Redier (1817–1892), French clockmaker, Paris, Wecker, clocks, scientific instruments.
 Charles Edouard Jacot (1817–1897), Swiss watchmaker, Le Locle, c. 1830 New York, Chinese Duplexhemmung.
 John Poole (1818–1867), English watchmaker, London, chronometer.
 Charles Fasoldt (1818–1898), American watchmaker, Albany, chronometer, Fasoldt-Hemmung, fine adjustment
 Christian Reithmann (1818–1909), German watchmaker and inventor. machines, free escapement, four stroke motor.
 Johannes Bürk (1819–1872), German clockmaker and entrepreneur, Villingen-Schwenningen. founder of the clock company Bürk.
 Gustav Eduard Becker (1819–1885), German clockmaker from Schlesien, founder of the Gustav Becker clock company.
 Eduard Phillips (1821–1889), French mathematician, Paris, precision adjustment, compensating balance wheels.
 Johann Ignaz Fuchs (1821–1893), German mechanic and clockmaker, Bernburg, Turmuhren.
 Betty Linderoth (1822–1900), Swedish mechanic and clockmaker
 Thomas Mercer (1822–1900), English watchmaker, London, chronometer.
 Erhard Junghans (1823–1870), German clockmaker, Schramberg, founder of the Junghans brand.
 Ulysse Nardin (1823–1876), Swiss watchmaker, Le Locle, chronometer.
 Henri Robert Ekegrèn (1823–1896), Danish watchmaker, Geneva, Urban Jürgensen, chronometer
 Onésime Dumas (1824–1889), French chronometer maker, Saint-Nicolas-d'Aliermont, chronometer.
 Victor Kullberg (1824–1890), Swedish chronometer maker, London, chronometer blanks.
 Louis Brandt (1825–1879), Swiss watchmaker and politician, La Chaux-de-Fonds, founder of Omega
 Johann Andreas Ludwig Teubner (1825–1907), clockmaker of the court, Dresden, creator of the second Five-Minutes-Clock of the Semperoper.
 Karl Moritz Großmann (1826–1885), German clockmaker, Glashütte, marine chronometer, precision clock.
 Hans Jess Martens (1826–1892), German watchmaker and author, head of the Badischen watchmaking school Furtwangen.
 Julius Assmann (1827–1886) watchmaker and watch producer, Glashütte, chronometer and deck watch.
 Bonaventura Eijsbouts (1827–1920), Dutch clockmaker, Asten, clock tower maker Royal Eijsbouts.
 Julius Grossmann (1829–1907), German watchmaker, director of the watchmaking school in Le Locle.
 Charles-Émile Tissot (1830–1910), Swiss Watchmaker and politician, Le Locle, co-founder of Tissot.
 Charles Shepherd jun. (1830–1905), English clockmaker, engineer, made the gate clock of the Greenwich Observatory.
 Maurice Ditisheim (1831–1899), Swiss watchmaker and entrepreneur, in La Chaux-de-Fonds, Vulcain.
 Alexis Favre (1832–1908), Swiss watchmaker, Geneva. famous Regleur.
 Albert Pellaton-Favre (1832–1914), Swiss watchmaker, tourbillon-chronometer.
 François Perregaux (1834–1877), Swiss watchmaker, Le Locle, first watchmaker in Japan.
 James Favre-Brandt (1836–1910), Swiss Watchmaker, Le Locle, pioneer of watchmaking in Asia (1863).
 Hilda Petrini (1838–1895), first female Swedish watchmaker, Stockholm, chronometer.
 Karl Julius Späth (1838–1919), German tinker, Steinmauern, astronomical clock.
 Wilhelm Ehrlich (1839–1894), German watchmaker, Bremerhaven, marine chronometer.
 Edouard Heuer (1840–1892), Swiss watchmaker, Biel. Heuer.
 Charles-Auguste Paillard (1840–1895), Swiss watchmaker, palladium alloy for hairsprings.
 Heinrich Zilliken (1841–1900), German clockmaker, Münstermaifelder Turmuhrenfabrik Turmuhrbau.
 Florentine Ariosto Jones (1841–1916), American watchmaker and entrepreneur, New Hampshire, USA, founder of IWC.
 James Favre-Brandt (1841–1923), Swiss watchmaker, Le Locle, pioneer of watchmaking in Japan (1863).
 Johannes Dürrstein (1845–1901), German watchmaker, Glashütte, founder of Glashütter Uhrenfabrik "Union" (1893–1926).
 Richard Lange (1845–1932), German watchmaker and entrepreneur, Glashütte, A. Lange & Söhne.
 Eduard Kummer (1845–?), Swiss watchmaker and founder of Ed. Kummer AG.
 Sigmand Riefler (1847–1912), German clockmaker, Munich, Riefler precision pendulum clocks.
 Webster Clay Ball (1847–1922), American jeweller and watchmaker, Cleveland, railroad chronometer, Hamilton Watch Company.
 Henri Lioret (1848–1938), French watchmaker and inventor, Paris, automatons, first useful audio recordings.

1850–1900 

Joseph "Joe" Koen (1859–1944), Russian watchmaker & jeweler, Born in Vilna, Russia, immigrated to Austin, Texas. Koen founded Joe Koen & Son Jewelers in 1883 - Texas' oldest independently owned jewelry store. 
 Carl Ranch (c. 1900), Danish chronometer maker
 Albert Favarger (1851–1931), American clockmaker, Neuchâtel, electric slave clock
 Richard Bürk (1851–1934), German entrepreneur, Villingen-Schwenningen. Württembergische Uhrenfabrik Bürk.
 Arthur Junghans (1852–1920), German clockmaker, Schramberg, founder of Junghans.
 Curt Dietzschold (1852–1922), German engineer, watchmaker and teacher, director of the watchmaking school Karlstein a. d. Th. (Austria).
 Gustav Speckhart (1852–1919), German clockmaker of the court, inventor and clock collector, Nürnberg.
 Ludwig Strasser (1853–1917), German clockmaker, Glashütte, precision pendulum clocks, German watchmaking school Strasser & Rohde.
 Wilhelm Schultz (1854–1921), German watchmaker and editor, Stuttgart/Berlin, German calendar watchmaker.
 Paul David Nardin (1855–1920), Swiss watchmaker and Regleur, Le Locle.
 Josef Nicolaus (1855–1923), Austrian chronometer maker, Vienna, deck watch.
 Harlow E. Bundy (1856–1916), American clockmaker, Auburn, New York, mass production, Bundy Manufacturing Company.
 Richard Gläser (1856–1928), German watchmaker, Glashütte, pocket watch.
 Henning Hammarlund (1857–1922), Swedish watch producer, Svängsta, Halda.
 Paul Berner (1858–1942), Swiss watchmaker and teacher, longtime director of the watchmaking school in La Chaux-de-Fonds.
 Max Stührling (1859–1932), Swiss watchmaker, Biel. Stuhrling.
 Bahne Bonniksen (1859–1935), Danish watchmaker, London, Carousell.
 Léon Breitling (1860–1914), Swiss watchmaker, Saint-Imier, founder of Breitling SA.
 Kintarō Hattori (1860–1934), Japanese watchmaker, Tokyo, founder of Seiko.
 Hermann Goertz (1862–1944), German clockmaker, Glashütte, precision pendulum clock.
 Hugo Müller (1863–1943), German watchmaker, Glashütte.
 Carl Friedrich Bucherer (?–1933), Swiss watchmaker, Lucerne, founder of Carl F. Bucherer.
 Jens Jensen (1865–1933), German watchmaker, Glashütte, deck watch.
 Ludwig Trapp (1865–1949), German clockmaker, Glashütte, precision pendulum clocks.
 Max Richter (1866–1922), German clockmaker, Glashütte, precision pendulum clocks.
 Paul Ditisheim (1868–1945), Swiss watchmaker, La Chaux-de-Fonds, pocket watch and marine chronometer.
 Richard Griesbach (1868–1948) German watchmaker, Glashütte, compensating balance wheels for marine chronometer.
 Alfred Jaccard (?–1953), Swiss Regleur and chronometer maker, Besançon.
 Bruno Hillmann (1869–1928), German watchmaker, Zürich. first wrist watch.
 Georges Louis Ruedin (1870–1935), Swiss watch producer, Berner Jura, director of the Société Horlogère Reconvilier.
 Jens Olsen (1872–1945), Danish clockmaker, Ribe, astronomical world clock in Copenhagen.
 Jämes Pellaton (1873–1954), Swiss watchmaker, Le Locle, tourbillon.
 Louis Cartier (1875–1942), French watchmaker, Paris, Cartier watch brand.
 Rudolf Flume (um 1880), German watchmaker, Berlin, Flume-Werksucher.
 Jules Haag (1882–1953), mathematician, Besançon, Isochronism.
 Georges Schaeren (1882–1958), Swiss watchmaker, Biel, Mido SA.
 William Hamilton Shortt (1882–1971), English clockmaker, London, Shortt clock.
 Léon Hatot (1883–1953), French watchmaker and jeweller, Besançon, cofounder of the Chronometrical Society of France, Léon Hatot.
 Karl W. Höhnel (1885–1936), German clockmaker, Glashütte, precision pendulum clocks.
 William Baume (1885–1956), Swiss watchmaker, Geneva (Switzerland), founder of Baume & Mercier.
 Gustav Gerstenberger (1886–1983), German Regleur and chronometer maker, Glashütte, marine chronometer, deck watch.
 Alfred Helwig (1886–1974), German watchmaker, Glashütte, tourbillon.
 Louis Zimmer (1888–1970), Belgian clockmaker, Lier, astronomical clock  in Lier, Zimmer tower.
 André Bornand (1892–1967), Swiss watchmaker, Geneva. teacher of the watchmaking school Geneva.
 Reinhard Straumann (1892–1967), Swiss engineer, watch timing machine, Nivarox.
 John Harwood (1893–1965), English inventor and clockmaker, automatic wrist watch, Fortis watch brand.
 Rasmus Sørnes (1893–1967), Norwegian radio technician and clockmaker, Sola, astronomical clock.
 Paul Behrens (1893–1984), German clockmaker, Lübeck, astronomical clock.
 Marius Lavet (1894–1980), French clockmaker, Paris, ATO-Uhren, Lavet stepper motor.
 Barney Mirvis (1895–1967), Swiss-trained South African watchmaker, Pretoria, Mirvis & Co.
 Georges Henri Ruedin (1895–1953), Swiss watchmaker, Bassecourt, Georges Ruedin SA.
 Adolf Scheibe (1895–1958), German physician, Berlin, engineer of the quartz clock.
 Albert Pellaton (1898–1966), Swiss watchmaker, Schaffhausen, Pellaton winding system for automatic watches.

1900–2000's 
 Udo Adelsberger (1904–1992), German physician, Königsberg. developer of the quartz clock.
 Kamiel Festraets (1904–1974), Flemish clockmaker, Sint-Truiden, astronomical clock of Sint-Truiden.
 Horst Landrock (1904–1990) German clockmaker and collector, Zittau, Sammlung Landrock.
 Hans Apel (1905–1958), German watch and chronometer maker, Glashütte, student of Alfred Helwig.
 Fred Lip (1905–1996), French producer of watches and machines, Besançon, Lip.
 Walter Storz (1906–1974), German master watchmaker, Hornberg, founder of the Stowa clock company.
 Georg Abeler (1906–1981), German watchmaker, Wuppertal, founder of Wuppertaler Uhrenmuseum.
 Henry Fried (1907–1996), American watchmaker, New York, author.
 Hans Jendritzki (1907–1996), German watchmaker and author, Hamburg.
 August Spetzler (1911–2010), German watchmaker, Nürnberg, student of Alfred Helwig, tourbillon.
 Willy Breitling (1913–1979), Swiss watchmaker, Saint-Imier, President of Breitling SA
 Karl Geitz (1913–2008), German watchmaker, teacher, founder of the Hessian watchmaking school.
 Max Hetzel (born 1921), Swiss physician, Biel, Bulova Accutron.
 Hans Lang (1924–2013), German watchmaker, astronomical clocks.
 George Daniels (1926–2011), (C. C.), English watchmaker, Master of the Worshipful Company of Clockmakers., Inventor of the coaxial escapement.
 Richard Mühe (1929–2009), German watchmaker, Furtwangen. president of the German Society for Timekeeping (1981 to 1999).
 Richard Daners (1930–2018), German watchmaker, works for Gübelin.
 Martin Burgess (born 1931), (FBHI), English watchmaker and author, Sculptural Clock, Gurney Clock.
 Wolfgang Hilberg (1932–2015), German engineer and professor of electronics, inventor of the radio clock.
 Jürgen Abeler (1933–2010), German art collector, watchmaker, goldsmith and gemologist.
 Kurt Klaus (born 1934), Swiss watchmaker, engineer at IWC, perpetual calendar with four digit year indication
 Roger Dubuis (1938–2017), Swiss watchmaker, Roger Dubuis SA.
 Derek Pratt (1938–2009), English watchmaker, collaboration with Urban Jürgensen SA.
 Anthony G. Randall (born 1938), English watchmaker, engineer of the Double-Axis-Tourbillon.
 Reinhard Meis (born 1940), German watchmaker and author.
 Svend Andersen (born 1942), (AHCI), Danish watchmaker, cofounder of the (AHCI).
 Carlo Crocco (born 1944), Italian watchmaker from Milan (Italy), cofounder of the Swiss-based luxury brand Hublot Watches.
 Vincent Calabrese (born 1944), (AHCI), Italian watchmaker, cofounder of the (AHCI), "Golden Bridge" of Corum, Universal Genève.
 Daniel Roth (born 1945), Swiss watchmaker, Daniel Roth SA (with the Bulgari company since 2000).
 Edmond Capt (born 1946), Swiss watchmaker, general director of Frédéric Piguet and Nouvelle Lémania, engineer Mouvement Valjoux 7750.
 Philippe Dufour (born 1948), (AHCI), Swiss watchmaker.
 Paul Gerber (born 1950), (AHCI), Swiss watchmaker, Zürich.
 Michel Parmigiani (born 1950), Swiss watchmaker. Parmigiani.
 Jean-Pierre Musy (born 1951), Swiss watchmaker, responsible for R&D at Patek Philippe.
 Ludwig Oechslin (born 1952), Italian watch engineer, La Chaux-de-Fonds, former director of the International Museum of Horology.
 Russell A. Powell (born 1954), American born watchmaker at Patek Philippe.
 Antoine Preziuso (born 1957), ((AHCI)), Swiss watchmaker, Patek Philippe, Antiquorum, tourbillon.
 Franck Muller (born 1958), Swiss watchmaker, Genthod, Franck Muller SA.
 Christophe Claret (born 1962), Swiss watchmaker, Christophe Claret SA.
 Beat Haldimann (born 1964), (AHCI), Swiss watchmaker, double regulator, tourbillon.
 Giulio Papi (born 1965), Swiss watchmaker, former Renaud & Papi SA, today Audemars Piguet.
 Thomas Prescher (born 1966), (AHCI), German watchmaker, Triple-Achs-Tourbillon.
 Barry B. Kaplan (born 1971), American watchmaker at KIVA Watch.
 Andreas Strehler (born 1971), (AHCI), Swiss watchmaker, Pendule Sympathique, moon phase, complication (horology).
 Johnny Dang (born 1974), Vietnamese American jeweler and watchmaker, based in Houston
 Konstantin Chaykin  (Konstantin Jurjewitsch Tschaikin) (born 1975), (AHCI), Russian watchmaker, Saint Petersburg, armband- and table clocks with complication.
 Valerii Danevych (born 1968), (AHCI), Ukrainian watchmaker, created first in the world wooden flying tourbillon.
 Yoshikazu Akahane (died 1999), Japanese engineer, creator of Seiko's Spring Drive mechanical movement regulated by a quartz oscillator instead of a traditional escapement.
 Roberto Bertotti (born 1967), Italian watchmaker, fixing most of the watches, clocks, chronometers, Pendulum clocks, etc. Workshop in Rovereto, Italy.
 Masahiro Kikuno (born 1983), (AHCI), Japanese watchmaker, created the first wristwatch with a Japanese clock complication.
 Andrzej Trojanowski (born 1979), independent watchmaker based in Warsaw, Poland.

References

Further reading 

 G. H. Baillie, C. Clutton, C. A. Ilbert: Britten's Old Clocks and Watches and their Makers. Bonanza Books, New York (USA) 1956.
 C. Spierdijk: Klokken en Klokkenmakers. de Bussy, Amsterdam (NL) 1965.
 Tardy: Dictionnaire des horlogers français. Paris (F) 1972.
 Stanislav Michal: Vývoj hodinářství v českých zemích. NTM Prague (CS) 1976.
 F. H. van Weijdom Claterbos: Viennese Clockmakers [...]. Interbook International B.V., Schiedam (NL) 1979. 
 Osvaldo Patrizzi, Fabien X. Sturm: Schmuckuhren 1790–1850 [...]. Callwey Verlag, Munich 1981, . 
 Helmut Krieg: Uhrmacher im Bergischen Land. Rheinland Verlag, Cologne 1994, .
 Brian Loomes, G. H. Baillie: watchmakers and Clockmakers of the World: Complete 21st Century Edition. Robert Hale Ltd, 2001, .
 Patrick Wesche, "Antique Chronographs" Ritter Verlag. Munich 2009.
 T.B. McMillan put forth the entry for Joseph "Joe" Koen, founder of Joe Koen & Son Jewelers.
 Jürgen Abeler: Meister der Uhrmacherkunst. 2. Auflage Uhrenmuseum Wuppertal, Wuppertal 2010, .
 Georg von Holtey; Ursula Bischof Scherer; Albert Kägi: Deutschschweizer Uhrmachermeister und ihre Werke vom 14. bis 19. Jahrhundert. Chronométrophilia, La Chaux-de-Fonds 2006, .

External links 

 UhrenH@nse: Uhrmacherverzeichnis (in German)
 watch-wiki: Kategorie:Biographie (in German)